The Evening Telegram is a name shared by the following newspapers:

 The Telegram, a daily newspaper in St. John's, Newfoundland and Labrador, Canada
 The Telegram (Herkimer), a daily newspaper in Herkimer, New York
 New York Evening Telegram, a defunct daily newspaper in New York City
 Portland Telegram, a defunct daily newspaper in the U.S. state of Oregon